Days in the Wake is the second studio album by Will Oldham. It was released under the moniker Palace Brothers on Drag City in 1994. Original copies of the album were eponymous.

Critical reception

Mark Deming of AllMusic gave the album 4.5 out of 5 stars, saying, "Days in the Wake is the simplest work in the Palace canon, and among the very best."

Track listing

Personnel
 Will Oldham – guitar, vocals
 Ned Oldham – bass guitar, backing vocals (3)
 Paul Oldham – percussion (3)

References

External links
 

1994 albums
Will Oldham albums
Domino Recording Company albums
Drag City (record label) albums